Randeck may refer to:

People
 House of Randeck, a German family whose seat was at Randeck Castle
 Eberhard of Randeck (died 1372), cathedral dean and bishop-elect of Speyer; see Randeck Castle
 Marquard of Randeck (1296–1381), Patriarch of Aquileia
 Marquard of Randegg (also: Randeck; died 1406), a bishop of Minden

Other uses
 Randeck Castle (Palatinate), ruined castle in Donnersbergkreis, Rhineland-Palatinate, Germany
 Randeck Maar Formation, Southwestern Germany
 Randeck Museum, Mannweiler-Cölln, Rhineland-Palatinate, Germany